Axel Bo Bernhardt Stensson Westerberg (20 November 1913 – 2 October 1991) was a Swedish Olympic sailor. In the 1936 Summer Olympics, he sailed with the 8-metre Ilderim, helmed by Tore Holm, and finished 4th.

References

Swedish male sailors (sport)
Olympic sailors of Sweden
1913 births
1991 deaths
8 Metre class sailors
Sailors at the 1936 Summer Olympics – 8 Metre